Sunila may refer to:

Given name 
Sunila Abeysekera (1952–2013), Sri Lankan human rights campaigner
Sunila Apte, Indian badminton player 
Sunila Devi (1963–2017), Indian social activist and political worker

Surname 
Juho Sunila (1875–1936), Finnish politician
Sunila I Cabinet
Sunila II Cabinet

Other uses 
Silent Sunila, a 2015 Indian Kannada-language film

Sinhalese feminine given names